ExTerminators is a 2009 American black comedy film written by Suzanne Weinert and directed by John Inwood. It stars Heather Graham, Amber Heard, Jennifer Coolidge, Matthew Settle, and Sam Lloyd.

Plot
Alex (Heather Graham) is a lonely accountant whose one act of rage results in her being sentenced to court-ordered therapy. There she meets Stella (Jennifer Coolidge), owner of an extermination business who uses her car as a weapon, and Nikki (Amber Heard), a dental technician with the face of an angel and the mind of a sociopath. Together these women form their own "silent revolution", wreaking havoc on the abusive men in their lives.

Cast
Heather Graham as Alex, a young woman sentenced to an anger management class
Amber Heard as Nikki, an insane dental technician 
Jennifer Coolidge as Stella, the owner of a pest control business
Matthew Settle as Dan, a police detective and love interest for Alex
Sam Lloyd as Hutt, a tax auditor
Joey Lauren Adams as Kim
Christian Mixon as Police Academy Instructor

Production
Principal photography for Ex-Terminators took place in Austin, Texas over five weeks between April and May 2008. It was shot entirely on location across the city, including scenes filmed downtown, in the South Congress area, the Austin State Hospital, and local neighborhoods.

Release
ExTerminators made its world premiere in Austin at the 2009 South by Southwest Film Festival.

References

External links

2009 films
2009 black comedy films
American black comedy films
2009 comedy films
2000s English-language films
2000s American films